Yoon Yo-seop(born March 30, 1982) is a coach for the KT Wiz of the KBO League. He joined SK Wyverns in 2008. After that, he belonged to LG Twins in 2010, and he moved to KT Wiz in 2015. He moved from being a catcher to coach in 2017. He graduated Dankook University.

References

External links 

 Yoon yo-seop on MyKBO Stats

Living people
1982 births
Baseball coaches
KT Wiz coaches
Sportspeople from Seoul